Simpsonichthys perpendicularis is a species of killifish from the family Rivulidae.
It is found in the Jequitinhonha River basin in Brazil. 

References

perpendicularis
Taxa named by Wilson José Eduardo Moreira da Costa
Taxa named by Dalton Tavares Bressane Nielsen
Taxa named by André Cordeiro de Luca
Fish described in 2001